Khwaja Du Koh is a town and the center of Khwaja Du Koh District, Jowzjan Province, Afghanistan. It is situated few miles northwest of the city of Sheberghan and a mile northeast from the main Andkhoy-Sheberghan road.

See also
 Jowzjan Province

Populated places in Jowzjan Province